Club Deportivo Politécnico is an Ecuadorian football club based in Quito. The club was founded on February 1, 1963, by students and professors from the National Polytechnic School after España ceded its franchise to the club. After several participations in the Serie A in the late 1960s and early 1970s, the club lost its division level in 1972; since then the team plays the Quito Amateur Championship organized by Asociacion de Futbol Amateur de Pichincha (AFAP) in order to regain its place in the second division of the Ecuadorian football league system. The most successful season in club history came in 1967 when it was the runner-up of the regional Campeonato Profesional Interandino.

Achievements
Campeonato Profesional Interandino
Runner-up (1): 1967

Current President
Juan Nieto

Current Coach
Edison Lascano
2011

Coaches
Edison Lascano
years: 2005 – 2011
Juan Bosmediano
years: 2002–2003
Carlos Corrales
years: 2001
César Faráh
years: 1991 – 2000

References

Defunct football clubs in Ecuador
Association football clubs established in 1963
Association football clubs disestablished in 1972
1951 establishments in Ecuador
1972 disestablishments in Ecuador